Narayan Pal (born 15 April 1965) is an Indian politician and social worker who is working as National Coordinator of Kisan Congress, and in charge of Andaman Nicobar and Lakshadweep and Goa. A two time (2002-2012) Member of the Legislative Assembly (Uttarakhand) from 2002-2012, Narayan Pal is a leader of the Indian National Congress party. As MLA from 2002 to 2012, Narayan Pal served as leader of Vidhan Mandal Dal and Chairman Assurance Committee, Uttarakhand Legislative Assembly. He started his political career at age of 18 years in 1984-85, when he was elected joint secretary of MB PG College, Haldwani. In the year 1990 he became president of Youth Congress Nainital district and remain in this post till 1995. He was also vice president of Indian Youth Congress Uttar Predesh.

Personal life
Narayan Pal married Kamini Pal on 14 January, 1994. They have three children, Nirbhay Pal (CEO of Pal College of Technology and Management, Uttarakhand), Atul Pal (studying from Middlesex University, London) and Nakul Pal. Narayan Pal and family is currently living in Haldwani (Nainital).

Early life and education
Narayan Pal was born in Haldwani city, Nainital district of the Uttar Pradesh (now Uttarakhand) on 15 April 1965 to Brijlal and Anandi Devi. He received a Bachelor of Arts from Kumaon University, Nainital.

Political career
Starting at college level politics, he was elected joint secretary of MB PG College Kumaon University, Nainital, in 1984-85 session. He was president of Youth Congress Nainital district from 1990 to 1995. He resigned from Congress in 1995 and joined Samajwadi Party and contest Lok Sabha election against Narayan Dutt Tiwari (Congress Tiwari).
In 2002 and 2007 he was elected Member of the Legislative Assembly (MLA) (Uttarakhand) from Sitarganj (Udham Singh Nagar) constituency. He was Leader Vidhan Mandal Dal (BSP) in 2002 and Chairman Assurance Committee, Uttarakhand Legislative Assembly in 2007. He contested Lok Sabha Election from BSP in 2009 as well.

Family and business
Narayan Pal is also chairman of Pal College of Technology and Management. Since the past three decades the PAL GROUP have been contributing immensely in the field of development of Infrastructure facilities in India. It has a record of timely completion of projects like Bridges, Highways, Railways, Roads and other Irrigation projects. He is a high level of taxpayer as well. The group has multiple Industries, and working in different sectors some of which are:
 Pal College of Technology & Management (PCTM)
 Brij Lal Hospital & Research Center.
 Pal College of Nursing & Medical Sciences

References

 
 </ref>

1965 births
Living people
Uttarakhand politicians